Dawid Tomala (born 27 August 1989 in Tychy) is a Polish race walker. He is the reigning Olympic champion in the 50 kilometres walk, having won the gold medal at the 2020 Tokyo Olympics. Tomala also represented his country at the 2012 London Olympics, finishing 19th in the 20 km walk.

He began race walking in 2003 at the UKS Maraton Korzeniowski club in Bieruń, Poland. He is coached by his father, Grzegorz Tomala. Dawid won multiple Polish national titles in racewalking.

Competition record

Personal bests
3000 metres race walk – 10:56.98 (Šamorín 2018)
3000 metres race walk indoor – 10:58.89 (Glasgow 2018) 
5000 metres race walk – 19:16.93 (Gdańsk 2013)
5000 metres race walk indoor – 19:13.16 (Spała 2013)
10,000 metres race walk – 40:17.62 (Lublin 2018)
10 kilometres race walk – 40:11 (Katowice 2013)
10 kilometres race walk – 1:20:30 (Olomouc 2013)

References

External links
 
 

1989 births
Living people
Polish male racewalkers
Athletes (track and field) at the 2012 Summer Olympics
Athletes (track and field) at the 2020 Summer Olympics
Medalists at the 2020 Summer Olympics
Olympic gold medalists in athletics (track and field)
Olympic gold medalists for Poland
Olympic athletes of Poland
People from Tychy
Sportspeople from Silesian Voivodeship
Polish Athletics Championships winners
20th-century Polish people
21st-century Polish people